This article contains a list of useful plants, meaning a plant that has been or can be co-opted by humans to fulfill a particular need.  Rather than listing all plants on one page, this page instead collects the lists and categories for the different ways in which a plant can be used; some plants may fall into several of the categories or lists below, and some lists overlap (for example, the term "crop" covers both edible and non-edible agricultural products).

Edible plants
:Category:Edible plants
:Category:Cereals
List of edible flowers
:Category:Forages
:Category:Grains
:Category:Spices
List of culinary herbs and spices

Fruits and vegetables
:Category:Fruit
:Category:Edible nuts and seeds
:Category:Vegetables
:Category:Inflorescence vegetables
:Category:Leaf vegetables
:Category:Root vegetables
:Category:Edible seaweeds
:Category:Stem vegetables

Forestry
:Category:Wood
:Category:Shrubs
:Category:Trees

Medicine, drugs, psychoactives
1.:Category:Medicinal plants
2.:Category:Medicinal herbs and fungi
3.List of Plants Used for Smoking

Other economic purposes
:Category:Crops
:Category:Energy crops
List of beneficial weeds

References

External links
Plants For A Future
Permaculture Information Web
Plant Resources of Tropical Africa (PROTA)
Handbook of Energy Crops
Lost Crops of Africa: Volume 1: Grains
Lost Crops of the Incas
Bibliography on underutilized roots and tubers crops
Australian New Crops Web Site
Plant Resources of South East Asia (PROSEA)
Global Facilitation Unit for Underutilized Species
UN Centre for the Alleviation of Poverty through Secondary Crops' Development in Asia and the Pacific (UNCAPSA)
Traditional African Vegetables
ECHO (Educational Concerns for Hunger Organization)

Useful plants
Agriculture-related lists